Endecatomus dorsalis is a species of beetle in the family Endecatomidae. It is found in North America in the southern United States.

The adults and larvae of this beetle feed on bracket fungus, such as Polyporaceae and Hymenochaetaceae.

References

Further reading

 

Bostrichoidea
Articles created by Qbugbot
Beetles described in 1848